Vertical perspective may mean:

 A form of perspective (graphical) used in Ancient Egypt, where nearer figures are shown below larger ones
 The special case of the General Perspective projection where the camera (in space) directly faces the centre of the Earth